Susan Hammond Marshall is an American mathematician specializing in number theory, arithmetic geometry, and mathematical proof techniques. She is an associate professor of mathematics at Monmouth University.

Education and career
Marshall is a 1993 graduate of Wake Forest University, majoring in mathematics with a minor in psychology; she cites Wake Forest professors John Baxley and Stephen B. Robinson as early mentors in mathematics. After taking a position analyzing Hubble Space Telescope data at the Goddard Space Flight Center,
she went to the University of Arizona for graduate study in mathematics, completing her Ph.D. in 2001. Her dissertation, Crystalline Representations and Neron Models, was supervised by Minhyong Kim.

She was a postdoctoral researcher at the University of Texas at Austin from 2001 to 2004, and joined the Monmouth faculty in 2004.

Recognition
In 2014, Marshall won the Carl B. Allendoerfer Award of the Mathematical Association of America for her work with Monmouth colleague Donald R. Smith applying control theory to the distribution of prime numbers. In the same year, she also won the Paul R. Halmos – Lester R. Ford Award with Alexander Perlis for their work showing that Heronian tetrahedra can always be realized with integer coordinates. Her work with Smith also won the 2016 Chauvenet Prize.

In 2019 the New Jersey Section of the Mathematical Association of America gave Marshall their Award for Distinguished College or University Teaching of Mathematics.

References

External links
Home page

Year of birth missing (living people)
Living people
21st-century American mathematicians
American women mathematicians
Wake Forest University alumni
University of Arizona alumni
Monmouth University faculty
21st-century American women